Iso Sluijters (born 24 July 1990) is a Dutch handball player for GC Amicitia Zürich and the Dutch national team.

He represented the Netherlands at the 2020 European Men's Handball Championship.

References

External links

1990 births
Living people
Dutch male handball players
Expatriate handball players in Poland
Dutch expatriate sportspeople in Spain
Dutch expatriate sportspeople in Germany
Dutch expatriate sportspeople in Norway
Dutch expatriate sportspeople in Poland
SDC San Antonio players
Liga ASOBAL players
Sportspeople from Eindhoven